Blink Bonnie is a historic home located at Schodack in Rensselaer County, New York.  It was built about 1850 and remodeled and enlarged about 1915.  It is a two-story, frame building with a low pitched gable roof in the Greek Revival style.  There is a large two-story rear wing.  It features a one-story, Colonial Revival style entrance porch added about 1915.  Also on the property is a large English barn dated to about 1900, a garage, and an ice house / chicken coop.

It was listed on the National Register of Historic Places in 2000.

References

Houses on the National Register of Historic Places in New York (state)
Greek Revival houses in New York (state)
Houses in Rensselaer County, New York
National Register of Historic Places in Rensselaer County, New York